Justin Benson (born June 9, 1983) is an American filmmaker and actor. He is best known for his work with creative partner Aaron Moorhead.

Early life
Justin Benson was born on June 9, 1983.

Career 
Benson wrote the 2013 critically acclaimed horror film Resolution and directed it with his filmmaking partner Aaron Scott Moorhead.

The pair's directorial work can also be found in the anthology film V/H/S: Viral in the segment entitled "Bonestorm", and the 2014 romantic body horror film Spring, which Benson also wrote. Spring premiered at the 2014 Toronto International Film Festival, and was publicly praised by both Richard Linklater and Guillermo del Toro.

In 2017 Benson wrote, co-directed and starred alongside Moorhead in the science-fiction horror film The Endless, which premiered at the 2017 Tribeca Film Festival. The Endless was released theatrically in North America in 2018 by Well Go USA.

Filmography
Film

Television

References

External links 
 

1983 births
Living people
American film directors
American film editors
American film producers
American male actors
American male film actors
American male screenwriters
American television directors
Actors from California
Male actors from San Diego
Film directors from California
Film producers from California
Screenwriters from California